was a village located in Iwase District, Fukushima Prefecture, Japan.

As of 2003, the village had an estimated population of 5,993 and a density of 93.31 persons per km². The total area was 64.23 km².

History 
Shirakata village merged the Shirae village and it was Iwase village in 1955.

On April 1, 2005, Iwase, along with the town of Naganuma (also from Iwase District), was merged into the expanded city of Sukagawa

Education 
・Shirakata Primary School

・Shirae Primary School

・Iwase Junior High School

Event 
A Japanese drone meeting held at Iwase yukyu no sato in every August.

Galaxy

See also 
・Naganuma, Fukushima

・Ten-ei, Fukushima

・Sukagawa,Fukushima

References

External links
Sukagawa official website
Iwase commercial and industrial association 
Iwase yukyu no sato (岩瀬悠久の里)
Iwase's ancient tale(Japanese)

Dissolved municipalities of Fukushima Prefecture